Britt Lundberg (born 19 April 1963) is a politician in the Åland Islands, an autonomous and unilingually Swedish territory of Finland. She served as President of the Nordic Council during the 2017 session. She was formerly Speaker of the Parliament of Åland 2011–2015, Deputy Premier and Minister of Culture and Education 2007–2011, Minister of administration, equality and EU affairs 2005–2007 and a Member of the lagting (Åland parliament) 1999–2004.

References 

1963 births
Living people
Speakers of the Parliament of Åland
Members of the Parliament of Åland
Women government ministers of Åland
21st-century Finnish women politicians
Government ministers of Åland